Šatare is a village in the municipality of Donji Vakuf, Bosnia and Herzegovina.

References

Populated places in Donji Vakuf